"Pray"
is the third single released by Tomoko Kawase under the name Tommy heavenly6, and the second single released for the Heavy Starry Heavenly album. Two versions were offered, included a version with an alternative cover, stickers, and DVD. "Pray" was used as the first opening for the Gintama anime series. "Pray" peaked at #10 on the Oricon singles chart.

Track listing

Music video
A music video was released for Pray featuring Tomoko Kawase as a samurai.

Merchandise
In July 2011, Tomoko Kawase released various memorabilia items on her official site inspired by the Pray music video through Lightvan Company, including a kimono style robe and plush toy.

References

External links 
 Tommy heavenly6 Official Site
 Scans from Pray Single
 Tommy heavenly6 "Official Goods Store"

2006 singles
Tomoko Kawase songs
Anime songs
Songs written by Tomoko Kawase